Signpost to Murder is a 1965 American crime thriller film directed by George Englund from a screenplay by Sally Benson, based on the 1962 play of the same name by Monte Doyle. The film stars Joanne Woodward, Stuart Whitman, and Edward Mulhare. It was released on May 19, 1965, by Metro-Goldwyn-Mayer.

Synopsis
A man, on the run after killing his wife, takes refuge in the house of a woman who is hiding dark secrets of her own.

Cast
 Joanne Woodward as Molly Thomas
 Stuart Whitman as Alex Forrester
 Edward Mulhare as Dr. Mark Fleming
 Alan Napier as The Vicar
 Joyce Worsley as Mrs. Barnes
 Leslie Denison as Superintendent Bickley
 Murray Matheson as Dr. Graham
 Hedley Mattingly as Police Constable Mort Rogers
 Carol Veazie as Auntie

Remake
Yash Chopra and B R Chopra remade it in India as the 1969 Hindi film Ittefaq starring Rajesh Khanna and Nanda. B R  Chopra's grandson, Abhay Chopra, remade it in India as the 2017 Hindi film Ittefaq starring Sidharth Malhotra and Sonakshi Sinha.

See also
 List of American films of 1965

References

External links
 
 
 
 

1965 films
1965 crime films
1960s American films
1960s crime thriller films
1960s English-language films
1960s mystery thriller films
American black-and-white films
American crime thriller films
American films based on plays
American mystery thriller films
Films directed by George Englund
Films scored by Lyn Murray
Films set in country houses
Films set in England
Metro-Goldwyn-Mayer films